The Cats is a Dutch rock band.

The Cats may also refer to:

The Cats (reggae band), British reggae band
Cats U.K., British pop band
The Cats (album), a 1957 jazz album featuring Tommy Flanagan and John Coltrane
 The Cats (1965 film), a Swedish film
 The Cats (1968 film), an Italian film
The Cats, a nickname of the Kilkenny Hurling Team
The Cats, a nickname of the Geelong Football Club

See also
Cats (disambiguation)